CEHS may refer to:
 Cape Elizabeth High School, Cape Elizabeth, Maine, United States
 Centennial High School (Corona, California), United States
 Centennial High School (Peoria, Arizona), United States
 Central Etobicoke High School, Etobicoke, Ontario, Canada
 Cheyenne East High School, Cheyenne, Wyoming, United States
 Clovis East High School, Clovis, California, United States
 College of Education and Human Sciences (University of Nebraska–Lincoln)
 Columbus East High School, Columbus, Indiana, United States